Il volpone is a  1988 Italian comedy film directed in by Maurizio Ponzi, inspired by Ben Jonson's comedy with the same name. The film stars Enrico Montesano, Enrico Maria Salerno and Paolo Villaggio.

Plot 
Set in the Ligurian Riviera during the 1980s, it features Paolo Villaggio as Ugo Maria Volpone, a rich but apparently ill ship company owner. He is surrounded by a series of relatives and friends (played by Enrico Maria Salerno, Renzo Montagnani, Alessandro Haber) who blandish him in order to inherit his estate. The shrewd Volpone, in return, organizes a hoax against them to betray their greed. In the movie, he is joined by a new waiter, Bartolomeo Mosca (Enrico Montesano), who quickly shows himself to be as cunning as Volpone in arranging humiliations.

Cast 

Enrico Montesano: Bartolomeo Mosca
Enrico Maria Salerno: Ciro Corvino
Renzo Montagnani: Raffaele Voltore
Athina Cenci: Marta Corbaccio
Alessandro Haber: Ernesto Corbaccio
Mariangela Giordano: Eliana Voltore
Eleonora Giorgi: Francesca Corvino
Paolo Villaggio: Ugo Maria Volpone
Maurizio Donadoni: Aldo Marignano
Sabrina Ferilli: Rosalba Marignano

References

External links

Italian comedy films
1988 comedy films
Films directed by Maurizio Ponzi
1988 films
Works based on Volpone
1980s Italian films